Fritz Wilde (4 July 1920 – 25 August 1977) was a German football player and manager, who played as a forward.

References 
 

1920 births
1976 deaths
German footballers
Association football forwards
SpVgg Greuther Fürth players
FC St. Pauli players
Tennis Borussia Berlin players
German football managers
Tennis Borussia Berlin managers